Porta Garibaldi could refer to:
 Porta Garibaldi (Milan city gate), a gate in Milan, Northern Italy
 Porta Garibaldi (Milan), the surrounding district named after the gate
 Milano Porta Garibaldi railway station, a major railway station located to the north of the gate
 Garibaldi FS (Milan Metro), a metro station named after the railway station